Association law is a term used in the United States for the law governing not-for-profit corporations under various tax codes.  This includes charitable organizations, which are generally classified under 501(c)3 in the IRS Tax Code, professional societies, guilds and trade associations, which are classified under 501(c)6, and homeowner associations, which are classified under 501(c)4.  There are other classification types, but these are the primary ones.

The activities allowed by the IRS vary for each type of association.  For example, trade associations are allowed to do political lobbying, but charitable organizations are not.  There are nuances to both of these, but the idea is to ensure that each type of organization has guidelines for its activities which match the purpose and mission of the nonprofit.  There are other differences, as well, which can be learned through research on the American Society of Association Executives (asaecenter.org) or other association-focused resources.

Here is the summary published by the IRS for the 501(c)3 classification:
To be tax-exempt under section 501(c)(3) of the Internal Revenue Code, an organization must be organized and operated exclusively for exempt purposes set forth in section 501(c)(3), and none of its earnings may inure to any private shareholder or individual. In addition, it may not be an action organization, i.e., it may not attempt to influence legislation as a substantial part of its activities and it may not participate in any campaign activity for or against political candidates.

Organizations described in section 501(c)(3) are commonly referred to as charitable organizations. Organizations described in section 501(c)(3), other than testing for public safety organizations, are eligible to receive tax-deductible contributions in accordance with Code section 170.

The organization must not be organized or operated for the benefit of private interests, and no part of a section 501(c)(3) organization's net earnings may inure to the benefit of any private shareholder or individual. If the organization engages in an excess benefit transaction with a person having substantial influence over the organization, an excise tax may be imposed on the person and any organization managers agreeing to the transaction.

Section 501(c)(3) organizations are restricted in how much political and legislative (lobbying) activities they may conduct. For a detailed discussion, see Political and Lobbying Activities. For more information about lobbying activities by charities, see the article Lobbying Issues; for more information about political activities of charities, see the FY-2002 CPE topic Election Year Issues.  

501(c)4 - Homeowners Associations and Related Similar Nonprofits

Real estate developers often choose to maximize residential construction to clusters of residences within real property parcels. Many people purchase their residence within an association for reasons such as location along beaches and other areas, amenities, uniformity of appearance and other particular benefits or reasons.  Associations are registered by the developer of the community as a not-for-profit corporation, which form of corporation is also governed by particular statutes.

The legal forms of residential associations include homeowner associations, condominium associations, cooperative associations and mobile home associations. Thus, state laws are enacted to address specific types of associations applicable to the type of communities and relationships between the governing association and its constituents.

Florida law
In Florida there are statutes under Ch. 718, The Condominium Act, Ch. 719, regarding Co-Operative ownership, Ch. 720, governing Homeowner Associations, and Ch. 721, controlling laws for Mobile Homes.  The laws for such associations continually evolve to address important legal and socioeconomic matters.

Deed restrictions apply to purchasers of residential interests within such communities pursuant to a recorded Declaration, By-Laws, Covenants and Restrictions and/or Rules and Regulations for the particular community. Associations and all owners therein are subject to state statutes enacted for the particular form of community. Thus, compliance with such restrictions is mandatory and will be enforce by an applicable court of law and/or arbitration unless such restrictions are declared to be invalid or otherwise illegal.

Associations are also required to comply with applicable laws concerning structural and other components of the condominium or other applicable building to help ensure the safety of owners.

Once the developer arrives at a certain percentage of sales or permanent leasing of units within the association, the developer is statutorily required to transfer control of the association to owners other than the developer including control of a majority of the board of directors and delivery of financial records, all association records and all association property. E.g., Fla. Stat. sec. 718.301(1).

Particular laws apply to financial requirements, construction defects and other matters concerning the developer of associations with applicable deadlines and various statutes of limitations.  E.g., Fla. Stat. sec. 718.301(4)(c)(90-day deadline following turnover of control for the developer of a condominium to pay for and provide an independent audit of the financial records); e.g., Fla. Stat. sec. 718.203(developer warranties). Even a conversion of an older building to condominium can subject the developer to providing warranties to its owners. E.g., 718.618(6).  Thus, following the transition of the association from the developer to unit owners other than the developer, the board of directors has the exceedingly important task of timely evaluating same through expert and legal advice.

There is a growing trend for developers to choose to construct or convert buildings to non-residential commercial offices. One of the reasons for this growth in popularity is that the residential market is cooling with slower sales, high levels of investment ownership and high levels of supply.

References

United States legislation
Real estate in the United States
Real property law